Mecodinops is a genus of moths of the family Erebidae. The genus was erected by George Hampson in 1926.

Species
Mecodinops anceps (Mabille, 1879)
Mecodinops relata Walker, 1858
Mecodinops subpicta Schaus, 1911

References

Calpinae